Danny Chiha (Arabic: داني شيحا) is a Lebanese rugby league footballer for the Windsor Wolves in the Jim Beam Cup and NSW Cup. He has played for the Lebanon national rugby league team, and was selected to play in the 2009 European Cup. His position of choice is at centre.

Business career
Chiha is a successful accountant based in the Manly (Sydney) area

References

1985 births
Living people
Australian rugby league players
Australian people of Lebanese descent
Sportspeople of Lebanese descent
Lebanon national rugby league team players
Rugby league centres
Rugby league players from Sydney
Windsor Wolves players